Murray Polner (March 15, 1928 – May 30, 2019) was an American editor and author. He was the founding editor of Present Tense, a job he held for the entire two decades that the magazine was published. He was an anti-Vietnam War activist and a committed pacifist.

Background and education
The child of Jewish immigrants from Russia, Polner grew up in the Brownsville neighborhoods of Brooklyn. He graduated from Samuel J. Tilden High School, City College of New York (1950), earned an M.A. in history from the University of Pennsylvania (1976), and a Ph.D. from Union Institute & University in Russian history (1972). He taught for 10 years in a high school in Brooklyn, worked as an adjunct professor at several area colleges in the New York area, and served as executive assistant to Harvey B. Scribner, the first chancellor of the New York City Public Schools.

He served in the military in Japan during the Korean War.

He moved to Great Neck, New York, in 1961 with his wife Louise (Greenwald) Polner, and lived there for the rest of his life. The Polners had three children, Beth Polner Abrahams, Robert Polner and Alex Polner.

Career
Polner was the editor of the magazine Present Tense from the time of its founding in 1973 until it ceased publication in 1990.

He was the book review editor of History News Network until 2017.

Political views
Polner was a pacifist, although he allowed that the Holocaust was a difficult case, "It's the hardest question of all," he said, "and I'm not sure there's an answer." He was a vegetarian.

Books
No Victory Parades: The Return of the Vietnam Veteran (1970)
When Can I Come Home? a Debate on Amnesty for Exiles, Antiwar Prisoners, and Others (1972)
Rabbi: The American Experience, (1977). Branch Rickey: A Biography, (1982) Disarmed and Dangerous: The Radical Lives and Times of Daniel and Philip Berrigan, the militant anti-war priests, (2007). with co-author Jim O'GradyWe Who Dared to Say No to War: American Antiwar Writing from 1812 to Now, (2008) with Thomas E. Woods Jr.

Edited booksThe Challenge of Shalom: The Jewish Tradition of Peace & Justice, (1994) co-edited with Naomi Goodman
 Peace, Justice, and Jews: Reclaiming Our Tradition'', (2007) co-edited with Stefan Merken

References

External links 

 Murray Polner papers held by the Swarthmore College Peace Collection

American political writers
American magazine editors
20th-century American Jews
American people of Russian-Jewish descent
1928 births
2019 deaths
21st-century American Jews